Kimoto (written: 木本 or 樹元) is a Japanese surname. Notable people with the surname include:

, Japanese idol and singer
, Japanese footballer
, Japanese actress and voice actress
, Japanese footballer

Japanese-language surnames